Philippe Le Molt (26 March 1895 – 5 April 1976) was a French painter. His work was part of the painting event in the art competition at the 1932 Summer Olympics.

References

1895 births
1976 deaths
20th-century French painters
20th-century French male artists
French male painters
Olympic competitors in art competitions
People from Senlis